Ronald Edward "Ron" DeWolf (born Lafayette Ronald Hubbard Jr.; May 7, 1934 – September 16, 1991), also known as "Nibs" Hubbard, was the eldest child of Scientology's founder L. Ron Hubbard by his first wife Margaret Louise Grubb. He is known for having been highly critical of his father and of the Church of Scientology.

Early life
In his 1983 interview with Penthouse magazine, DeWolf said he was born prematurely at  after surviving an early abortion attempt; his father constructed a makeshift incubator with a shoe box, later a cupboard drawer, some rubbers, and used blankets and an electric light bulb to keep the baby warm.

Relationship with his father
Hubbard, Jr. claimed to have helped his father in the early days of Scientology but later rejected his father and Scientology, quitting in 1959 and changing his name to Ronald DeWolf. On November 6, 1982, in a Riverside, California, court, DeWolf sued for control of his father's estate, saying that his father was either deceased or incompetent. His reclusive father was proven to still be alive, although he never appeared in court.

Comments about his father

In 1981, DeWolf wrote his autobiography The Telling of Me, by Me, which he never published. 
After detailing how his father taught him the occult, he comments: 

In the mid-1980s, DeWolf gave several interviews and made sworn statements about his father's history. He explained that his father had been "deeply involved in the occult and black magic." Aleister Crowley's death in 1947 was a pivotal event that led Hubbard to "take over the mantle of the Beast". "Black magic is the inner core of Scientology", DeWolf said. "My father did not worship Satan. He thought he was Satan."

"99% of what my father ever wrote or said about himself is totally untrue", DeWolf said in a TV interview in 1983. That same year, he told Penthouse magazine that his father was a KGB asset and a drug addict who claimed to be Satan incarnate. According to DeWolf, his father was so close to embattled actor Errol Flynn, that Hubbard regarded Flynn as DeWolf's adoptive father, and that together Hubbard and Flynn engaged in such illegal activities as drug smuggling and statutory rape. Speaking on WDVM in Washington, DC, in 1983, on the Carol Randolph Morning Break show, he compared Sea Org with the Nazi SS, and described drug importation operations he alleged his father had been involved in, citing organised crime connections in Mexico and Colombia. In his opinion, Scientology was little more than a cult that existed to make money.

Sued by Mary Sue Hubbard
In 1984, his stepmother Mary Sue Hubbard filed a $5-million suit for fraud against DeWolf for his 1982 suit to gain control of L. Ron Hubbard's estate.

Biography of L. Ron Hubbard

DeWolf was named as co-author with Bent Corydon of the 1987 edition of a highly critical book about Hubbard and the Church of Scientology titled L. Ron Hubbard, Messiah or Madman?. Prior to publication, he sued the publisher Lyle Stuart, claiming breach of contract, and that his contributions were misrepresented. He retracted his negative comments about Hubbard and the church in submitted court affidavits, in which he called the biography "inaccurate and false", and demanded to have his name removed from the book. He said he was denied the opportunity to review the book until it was already in print.

In A Piece of Blue Sky former Scientologist Jon Atack writes:

In the updated revision of L. Ron Hubbard: Messiah or Madman?, which no longer listed DeWolf as co-author, Corydon comments:

Claims that DeWolf was paid for his statements have not been proven or refuted.

Death
DeWolf died of diabetes complications in 1991. He was working as a security guard at the Ormsby House Hotel Casino in Carson City, Nevada, at the time of his death.

See also
 Paulette Cooper
 Quentin Hubbard
 Scientology and the occult

References

External links

1934 births
1991 deaths
People from Encinitas, California
American amputees
Critics of Scientology
Deaths from diabetes
American former Scientologists
L. Ron Hubbard family
People from Carson City, Nevada
DeWolf family